The men's tournament of Ice hockey at the 2007 Asian Winter Games at Changchun, China, was held from 26 January to 3 February 2007.

Squads

Results
All times are China Standard Time (UTC+08:00)

Preliminary round

Group A

Group B

Group C

Group D

Classification 9th–11th

Semifinals

Classification 9th–10th

Classification 5th–8th

Semifinals

Classification 7th–8th

Classification 5th–6th

Final round

Final standing

References

External links
Official website

Men